Mcdonald's frog (Cophixalus mcdonaldi) is a species of frog in the family Microhylidae.
It is endemic to Australia.
Its natural habitat is subtropical or tropical moist lowland forests.
It is threatened by habitat loss.

References

Cophixalus
Amphibians of Queensland
Taxonomy articles created by Polbot
Amphibians described in 1985
Frogs of Australia